Raymond Eveleth Fowler (born November 11, 1933, in Salem, Massachusetts) is an American author and UFO researcher.

UFO research 
Fowler is best known for his UFO (Unidentified Flying Object) investigations and books focusing primarily on UFO sightings and close encounters in the New England area of the U.S., including the Betty Andreasson Luca Alien Abduction case written about by Fowler. He also investigated and wrote about the Allagash Abductions, an alleged multiple persons abduction case, which was cast into doubt by one of the witnesses in 2016.

Fowler served as Director of Scientific Investigations for MUFON and authored an older edition of the MUFON Field Investigators Manual. He also served as the Scientific Associate for the Center for UFO Studies. Fowler had also served as an associate member and eventually chairman of NICAP (National Investigations Committee on Aerial Phenomena).

Abduction 
Later in life, Fowler wrote about being an abductee himself sharing this information, most in-depth, in his autobiographical book UFO Testament: Anatomy of an Abductee. During an interview with Rosemary Ellen Guiley Fowler listed some of his abduction experiences that seem to correlate with other abductee testimony such as Betty and Barney Hill abduction and Betty Andreasson Luca.

Fowler's claim of being an abductee, and his UFO research as a whole, were not always welcome by his family members, because of their religious beliefs on the subject of UFOs. Fowler's extensive investigations in the UFO field lessened after the publication of The Watchers I and The Watchers II, in which Fowler initially acknowledged his UFO abduction experiences. He continued writing books on the subject, however, including his own experiences as well as local investigations he had not previously published.

Books 
 SynchroFile. Lincoln, 2004
 UFO Testament: Anatomy of an Abductee, 2002
 The Melchizedek Connection, 2001
 The Andreasson Legacy, 1997
 The Watchers II, 1995
 The Allagash Abductions, 1993
 The Watchers, 1991
 The Andreasson Affair - Phase Two, 1983
 Casebook of a UFO Investigator, 1981
 The Andreasson Affair, 1979
 UFOs: Interplanetary Visitors, 1974
Source:

Notes

External links

 National Investigations Committee on Ariel Phenomena (NICAP)
 Paul Rutgers.edu

1933 births
Paranormal investigators
American writers on paranormal topics
Living people
20th-century American non-fiction writers
21st-century American non-fiction writers
People from Kennebunk, Maine
Ufologists